Neklyudovo is a rural locality (a village) in Posyolok Ivanishchi, Gus-Khrustalny District, Vladimir Oblast, Russia. The population was 142 as of 2010. There are 5 streets.

Geography 
Neklyudovo is located 38 km north of Gus-Khrustalny (the district's administrative centre) by road. Mitenino is the nearest rural locality.

References 

Rural localities in Gus-Khrustalny District